Řehlovice is a municipality and village in Ústí nad Labem District in the Ústí nad Labem Region of the Czech Republic. It has about 1,500 inhabitants.

Administrative parts
Villages of Brozánky, Dubice, Habří, Hliňany, Moravany, Radejčín and Stadice are administrative parts of Řehlovice.

Notable people
Julius Mader (1928–2000), German jurist, journalist and writer

References

Villages in Ústí nad Labem District